Gladstone Airport  is an airport serving Gladstone, a city in the Australian state of Queensland.

The airport is owned and operated by the Gladstone Regional Council which took control of it by operation of the Local Government Reform when the Gladstone-Calliope Aerodrome Board was dissolved on 15 March 2007.

The main supplier of scheduled passenger air services is QantasLink, a subsidiary of Qantas, with most services non-stop to, or from Brisbane Airport. Virgin Australia commenced services to Brisbane 17 October 2011. They further announced at the launch of flights that a third-daily service would be added to the route from 16 January 2011. This has further been increased to six week-daily services since early 2013 mostly on ATR 72 aircraft with the Embraer 190 and the Boeing 737-800 also making regular appearances in the schedule. As of 17 July 2017 Alliance airlines has started to make 34 jet services between Gladstone and Brisbane.

As of March 2008, QantasLink was scheduled to operate about 38 return services per week (i.e. about 76 aircraft movements) between Gladstone and Brisbane using Dash 8 aircraft with seating from 50 to 74 passengers. In addition, a small number of flights operate northwards to Rockhampton, Mackay, Townsville and Cairns.

The Gladstone Regional Council commenced an upgrade of the airport in 2008. The council announced that the airport would not shut down during the upgrade.

In 2011 the late and liquidated Air Australia known as Strategic Airlines at the time began regular flights from Brisbane Airport and back with their Airbus A320 fleet; this only lasted around 4–5 months before ceasing operations to Gladstone due to the low number of passengers on each flight causing the airline to lose money.

In 2017 Cobham Aviation Services Australia Boeing 717 fleet began ceasing daily flights to the regional town due to higher demands in longer domestic route and also due to passenger numbers reducing after the mining boom from 2012 to 2016, because this Sunstate Airlines and Qantaslink had to increase operations to Gladstone to 6 daily flights. After this Cobham only flew in to fill for any Q400 flights that had issues or increased passenger numbers.

In February 2022, Bonza announced that the airport would become one of its 17 destinations with the airline planning to fly to Melbourne from Gladstone

Facilities 
It has 4 parking stands using a state of the art double level parking bay design, able to hold from Q200s to 737s, it also has a large GA parking areas to the west of the main terminal.

Airlines and destinations

Ground transport 
Buses operate between the town centre and the airport, but are only operational from Monday to Friday between 6am and 6pm. Taxis are also available, as are rental cars.

Statistics 
Gladstone Airport was ranked 27th in Australia for the number of revenue passengers served in financial year 2010–2011.

See also 
 List of airports in Queensland

References

External links 
 Gladstone Airport  at Gladstone Regional Council site

Airports in Queensland
Gladstone, Queensland
Buildings and structures in Central Queensland